The Royal Corps of Australian Electrical and Mechanical Engineers (RAEME; pronounced Raymee) is a corps of the Australian Army that has responsibility for the maintenance and recovery of all Army electrical and mechanical equipment. RAEME has members from both the Australian Regular Army and the Army Reserve.

Prior to being given the title of 'Royal', the Australian Electrical and Mechanical Engineers (AEME) were raised on 1 December 1942.  Some 64 years later, on 1 December 2006, the last independent RAEME Workshop was disbanded.  RAEME soldiers continue in their role to provide support through attachment to other units in Tech Support Troops, Sections or Platoons.

Role

Artificer
Artificer Sergeant Major (ASM) is an appointment held by a Warrant Officer Class 1 or 2 in RAEME (Depending on the size of the unit) whose function is the senior soldier/tradesmen for the repair and recovery of all mechanical and electrical equipment.

The role artificer is also used in the Australian Army in the Royal Corps of the Australian Electrical and Mechanical Engineers (RAEME) and applies to the senior soldier (tradesman) in the Combat Service Support Battalion (CSSB) or workshop Troop or Technical Support unit.

An ASM WO1 must have passed the Artificer training course and served as an Artificer Mechanical/Electrical or similar discipline as an Artificer Staff Sergeant and ASM Warrant Officer Class 2 prior to promotion to WO1.

Mission
RAEME's mission is to provide maintenance and recovery of all land electrical and mechanical equipment.

Engineering monitoring of equipment
RAEME Officers and Artificers are the asset managers of units and tasked to monitor the  equipment condition, reliability and equipment capability. This provides intelligence to the Commander on the operational capability and endurance of his Force now, and for future planning, and, it enables available engineering capacity throughout the support chain to be best directed to conserve the Inventory.

Engineering practicalities
While established engineering principles and techniques remain the guiding light for engineering management, major adaptations have to be made in the Forward Areas especially during active operations.

Forward repair in the field under conditions of threat and constant preparedness to defend and fight, and with limited engineering facilities in the way of cover, hard standing, lift, services, pre-planning, test equipment, machine and power tools and repair parts immediately at hand, demands not only high levels of military and trade skill but also ingenuity and a certain attitude and foresight.

Routinely the field repair, recovery and engineering management techniques needed in an Operational Theatre have to be adapted in a way that is rarely used, or appropriate, in a base or training environment. Often the techniques used in previous conflicts need to be rediscovered.

Customs and traditions

Motto
Following discussion with its sister Corps in the British Army, REME, approval was granted for RAEME to adopt the maxim ARTE et MARTE as their corps motto. The strict translation of the Latin, to English, is difficult, though the translation which has been officially adopted is "with skill and fighting". The corps motto is used as a call to express the guiding principle to unite the Corps and its elements, to achieve their individual or collective objectives for the task at hand.

March
The RAEME March (in quick time) is an arrangement of "Lilliburlero" and "The Boys in the Backroom".

Patron saint
Saint Eligius is recognised as the spiritual guide and mentor of RAEME personnel.  Saint Eligius is universally known as a protector of tradesmen and craftsmen.

Order of precedence

See also
Australian Defence Force
Royal Australian Engineers
Royal Electrical and Mechanical Engineers
Army engineering maintenance

References

Further reading

External links
 RAEME info
 The Australian Army website
 The RAEME Associations

Australian Army Corps
Australian army units with royal patronage
Military communications of Australia
Military units and formations established in 1942
Military units and formations disestablished in 2006
1942 establishments in Australia